Kučilat  is an abandoned village in the municipality of Karbinci, North Macedonia.

Demographics

The settlement last had inhabitants in the 1953 census, where it was recorded as being populated by 72 Albanians.

According to the 2002 census, the village had 0 inhabitants.

References

Villages in Karbinci Municipality
Albanian communities in North Macedonia